The Biblioteca Nacional de Panamá (in English: National Library of Panama), in 
Panama City, is the legal deposit and copyright library for Panama.

The library opened its doors on July 11, 1942, in a room located between 5th and 6th streets, adjacent to the presidency. In January 1961 the venue was moved to a building which had previously served as the Ricardo H. Newman College. On September 24, 1987, the library moved to Memorial Park Omar Torrijos, on Avenida Belisario Porras.

Library directors

Ernesto J. Castillero R. 1942–1945 
Galileo Patiño 1945–1953
Pereira Bonifacio 1953–1957
Ana Maria Jaen 1957–1966
Galileo Patiño 1966–1968 
Angela Alvarado 1968–1969
Carmen Cecilia Lasso 1969–1971
Raquel P. Zuniga 1971–1975 
Algis E. Borrero 1976–1978  
Ferguson Anays 1978–1980
Algis E. Borrero 1980–1986 
Ferguson Anays 1986–1987
Algis E. Borrero 1987–1988 
Algeria S. Pimentel 1988–1992 
Gloria Rodriguez de Robles 1993–1994 
Orestes Manuel Nieto 1994–1995
Algeria S. Pimentel 1995–1998

Directors National Library Foundation of Panama (1996–present)

Barrantes Nitzia  Technical Director
Maria Brenes Majela Administrative Director

External links
 Official site 

Government of Panama
Panama
Panamanian culture
1942 establishments in Panama
Libraries established in 1942
Libraries in Panama